Derwent Bridge is a rural locality in the local government area (LGA) of Central Highlands in the Central LGA region of Tasmania. The 2016 census has a population of 23 for the state suburb of Derwent Bridge.
It is on the Lyell Highway at the southern edge of the Cradle Mountain-Lake St Clair National Park.

It is just south of Lake St Clair and the Lake St Clair visitor centre; and it is north of Lake King William and the Butlers Gorge Power Station.

It is also the last inhabited location before Linda Valley in the West Coast Range - this section of the highway passes through the Wild Rivers National Park.  In the past there were a couple of isolated houses along Lyell Highway that have been removed.

Today, Derwent Bridge features not only the bridge alluded to in its name – spanning the Derwent River – 
but accommodation units, and also a roadside public house.

Derwent Bridge was used as a principal filming location for the 2008 film The Last Confession of Alexander Pearce.

History 
Derwent Bridge was gazetted as a locality in 1959.

Derwent Bridge Post Office opened on 15 February 1937 and closed in 1980.

Geography
The Derwent River flows through from north to south. The northern end of Lake King William protrudes into the locality.

Road infrastructure
Route A10 (Lyell Highway) passes through from east to south-west. Route C193 (Lake St Clair Road) starts at an intersection with A10 and runs north-west until it exits.

References

External links
 Map of World Heritage Area

Towns in Tasmania
Central Highlands (Tasmania)
Localities of Central Highlands Council